China's Century of Humiliation is a documentary film created by Mitch Anderson. Released in 2011, it explores the tumultuous interaction between China and the European powers throughout the 19th century.

Summary
The documentary begins by comparing Confucianism and Christianity and how they translated in political thought, resulting in a collectivist society in China and an individualistic one in Europe. Then, the film explores why the industrial and scientific revolutions happened in not China but the West. The second part of the film, delves in the early encounters between the British Navy and the isolationist Qing dynasty. The root causes of the two Opium Wars are explored next, exposing the greed of the western powers and the incompetence of the Chinese rulers. The film time line ends with the First Sino-Japanese War of 1894, providing a comprehensive view of the decay of the last Chinese dynasty.

References

External links 

 

2011 films
American documentary films
Documentary films about historical events
American independent films
2011 documentary films
Documentary films about China
19th century in China
2010s English-language films
2010s American films